The Nakamoto Coefficient is a measure of a blockchain networks decentralisation, representing "the minimum number of entities whose proportions one can sum to get to 51% control."

The calculation is named after Satoshi Nakamoto and was created by Balaji Srinivasan and Leland Lee in the article "Quantifying Decentralization"  and has become a popular measure   of comparing the decentralisation of blockchain networks.

References

Blockchains